Boby Lương Nguyên Bảo aka "Boby Lương"  (born 31 December 1997) Vietnamese-Czech footballer who plays as a full-back for V.League 1 club Viettel

See also
 List of Vietnam footballers born outside Vietnam

References 

1997 births
Living people
Vietnamese footballers
Association football fullbacks
V.League 1 players
Viettel FC players